Urospermum, or prickly goldenfleece,  is a small genus of flowering plants in the dandelion tribe within the daisy family.

 Species
 Urospermum dalechampii  (L.) Scop. ex F.W.Schmidt -  Mediterranean from Spain + Morocco to the Aegean; naturalized in Australia
 Urospermum picroides (L.) Scop. ex F.W.Schmidt - Mediterranean + southwestern Asia from Portugal + Canary Islands to Pakistan; naturalized in Australia, North America, South America

References

External links
 Flora of North America

Asteraceae genera
Cichorieae